The 1978–79 Cypriot Second Division was the 24th season of the Cypriot second-level football league.  Keravnos Strovolou FC won their 1st title.

Format
Fourteen teams participated in the 1978–79 Cypriot Second Division. All teams played against each other twice, once at their home and once away. The team with the most points at the end of the season crowned champions. The first team was promoted to 1979–80 Cypriot First Division. The last two teams were relegated to the 1979–80 Cypriot Third Division.

Changes from previous season
Teams promoted to 1978–79 Cypriot First Division
 Omonia Aradippou

Teams relegated from 1977–78 Cypriot First Division
 Chalkanoras Idaliou

Teams promoted from 1977–78 Cypriot Third Division
 Adonis Idaliou

Teams relegated to 1978–79 Cypriot Third Division
 Orfeas Nicosia

League standings

See also
 Cypriot Second Division
 1978–79 Cypriot First Division
 1978–79 Cypriot Cup

References

Cypriot Second Division seasons
Cyprus
1978–79 in Cypriot football